J-Z Airport  is a town owned, public use airport located one nautical mile (2 km) north of the central business district of Almira, a town in Lincoln County, Washington, United States.

Facilities and aircraft 
J-Z Airport covers an area of 15 acres (6 ha) at an elevation of 1,950 feet (594 m) above mean sea level. It has one runway designated 16/34 with a turf and gravel surface measuring 1,900 by 48 feet (579 x 15 m).

For the 12-month period ending December 31, 2007, the airport had 50 aircraft operations, all general aviation.

References

External links 
 J-Z Airport (1W0) at WSDOT Airport Directory
 Aerial image as of July 1996 from USGS The National Map
 Aeronautical chart at SkyVector

Defunct airports in Washington (state)
Airports in Washington (state)
Transportation buildings and structures in Lincoln County, Washington